Tasmantrix calliplaca is a moth of the family Micropterigidae. It is known from eastern Australia, in coastal rainforest from Finch Hatton Gorge, Eungella Range in Queensland to Elizabeth Beach in New South Wales.

The forewing length is 2.9 mm for males and 3.3 mm for females. The forewing has strong
purplish-bronze reflections. There are three shining white fasciae. A short subcostal basal streak in the middle of the wing, contiguous with the white dorsum of the head above the eyes when at rest. Furthermore, a strong transverse band at mid-length, almost straight and parallel-sided and a small triangular area of white scales in the apex. The apical quarter of the wing, beyond the transverse band, is spangled with irregular white scales, often forming short rows along the veins. There is also a series of three to four small white patches on both the costa and termen of this area. The fringes are largely dark brownish-black, but often white tipped along the termen and at the apex. The hindwing is dark brownish-black with purple or bronzy reflections and the fringes are dark brownish-black.

References

Micropterigidae
Moths described in 1922